×
Advanced Science Letters is a peer-reviewed scientific journal published by American Scientific Publishers.  The editor-in-chief is Hari Singh Nalwa. Publishing formats include full papers, short communications, and special sections consisting of various formats.  The journal was established in June 2008, and is published by American Scientific Publishers, a company identified by Jeffrey Beall as a predatory publisher. Although the journal received a 2010 impact factor of 1.253, it ceased to be indexed the following year. The journal was discontinued in 2019.

Scope 
Coverage includes joining basic and applied original research across multiple disciplines. These are the physical sciences, biological sciences (including health sciences and medicine), computer sciences (including information science), agriculture sciences, geosciences, and environmental sciences (including environmental engineering). Education and public relations are also covered.

References

External links 
 

Multidisciplinary scientific journals
English-language journals
Publications established in 2008
Publications disestablished in 2019